Horná Streda (known as Vág-Szerdahely before 1898) is a village and municipality in Nové Mesto nad Váhom District in the Trenčín Region of western Slovakia.

History
In historical records the village was first mentioned in 1263.

Prior to 1918 it was part of Nyitra County, Austria-Hungary. It then became part of the First Czechoslovak Republic.

Geography
The municipality lies at an altitude of 169 metres and covers an area of 9.827 km². It has a population of about 1300 people. The village lies about 7 km north of Piešťany and approximately 12 km south of Nové Mesto nad Váhom. Horná Streda is about an hour's drive away from Bratislava, the capital of Slovakia.

The village lies on the banks of the river Váh and is the site of a small hydroelectric power plant.

Genealogical resources

The records for genealogical research are available at the state archive "Statny Archiv in Bratislava, Slovakia"

 Roman Catholic church records (births/marriages/deaths): 1735-1919 (parish A)
 Lutheran church records (births/marriages/deaths): 1871-1922 (parish B)

See also
 List of municipalities and towns in Slovakia

References

External links

 Official page
https://web.archive.org/web/20080111223415/http://www.statistics.sk/mosmis/eng/run.html
 Description of the power plant (in Slovak)
 Local plant breeding station (in Slovak)
Surnames of living people in Horna Streda

Villages and municipalities in Nové Mesto nad Váhom District